Elliptio angustata is a species of freshwater mussel, an aquatic bivalve mollusk in the family Unionidae, the river mussels.

This species is endemic to the United States.

References

Molluscs of the United States
Fauna of the Southeastern United States
angustata
Bivalves described in 1831
Taxonomy articles created by Polbot